Yums: The Mixtape is a mixtape by Guelo Star. It was released on April 11, 2012. It features artists such as De La Ghetto, Khriz, MC Ceja and Polaco.

Track listing

2012 mixtape albums
Reggaeton albums